Monroe is a city in Walton County, Georgia, United States, serving as the county seat. It is located both one hour east of Atlanta via US 78 and GA 138 to I-20 and east of Hartsfield–Jackson International Airport and is one of the exurban cities in the Atlanta metropolitan area. The population was 14,928 at the 2020 U.S. census.

History
Monroe was founded in 1818 as seat of the newly formed Walton County. It was incorporated as a town in 1821 and as a city in 1896.

Monroe was a major cotton producer in the state during the 1900s. The two main cotton mills in Monroe used to be the driving economic force in the region. Now the mills no longer produce for the cotton industry, but rather serve as economic engines for the region by housing antique markets, event space, and other unique retail.

In July 1946 the area was the site of the last mass lynching in the United States. A White mob attacked and killed two Black married couples who were driving through the area. The four people were pulled from their car and shot several times.

A Civil War memorial, in the form of a statue of a Confederate soldier, stands adjacent to the county courthouse in downtown Monroe.

Geography
Monroe is in the center of Walton County. U.S. Route 78 (Atlanta/Monroe Bypass) passes north of the city, leading west  to Loganville, and west  to downtown Atlanta, and east 25 miles to Athens. GA Bus. 10 runs through the city of Monroe. Georgia State Route 11 leads northwest from Monroe 15 miles to Winder, the Barrow County seat, and south 10 miles to Social Circle, and southwest  to eastern rural Newton County, east of Covington. State Route 138 leads south  to Conyers.

Monroe is located at  (33.793295, -83.710790).

Demographics

2020 census
As of the 2020 United States census, there were 14,928 people, 4,709 households, and 3,223 families residing in the city.

Economy
The east end of Monroe contains multiple industries:

Hitachi automotive systems of America
Tucker Door and Trim
Arkansas-headquartered Wal-Mart Stores, Inc.'s southeast Walmart Distribution Center 
Leggett & Platt Corporation

Education

Walton County School District
The Walton County School District holds pre-school to grade twelve, and consists of nine elementary schools, three middle schools, and four high schools. The district has 675 full-time teachers and over 10,368 students.

Schools

Public

Elementary
 Atha Road Elementary School
 Bay Creek Elementary School
 Harmony Elementary School
 Monroe Elementary School
 Walker Park Elementary School
 Walnut Grove Elementary School
 Sharon Elementary School
 Loganville Elementary School
 Youth Elementary School

Middle
 Carver Middle School
 Loganville Middle School
 Youth Middle School

High
 Monroe Area High School
 Loganville High School
 Walnut Grove High School
 Social Circle High School

Private
 George Walton Academy
 Loganville Christian Academy
 Monroe Country Day School

Notable people
 Javianne Oliver - 2020 Olympic Silver Medalist
 Alfred H. Colquitt - Governor of Georgia and senator who served as Confederate officer
 Frances Conroy - Golden Globe- and SAG Award-winning actress
 Besse Cooper  - suffragette, teacher, and World's Oldest Living Person 2011-2012
 Henry Fambrough - baritone singer, The Spinners
 Marquis Floyd - NFL player
 Michael Gallup - Dallas Cowboys wide receiver 
 Jake Garcia - NASCAR driver
 Lonnie Hillyer - jazz trumpeter
 Tyler Hubbard - country music singer/songwriter, member of band Florida Georgia Line
 Henry Dickerson McDaniel - Governor of Georgia from 1883 to 1886
 Prince Hulon Preston, Jr. - member of US House of Representatives
 Patricia Roberts - Olympic silver medalist and Women's Basketball Hall of Fame inductee
 Stephon Tuitt - NFL player for Pittsburgh Steelers
 Clifford Walker - Governor of Georgia from 1923 to 1927
 Bruce Williamson (born 1954) - Politician. Member of Georgia House of Representatives.

References

Cities in Georgia (U.S. state)
County seats in Georgia (U.S. state)
Cities in Walton County, Georgia